This list shows the IUCN Red List status of the 90 mammal species occurring in Greece. One of them is endangered, ten are vulnerable, and three are near threatened.
The following tags are used to highlight each species' status as assessed on the respective IUCN Red List published by the International Union for Conservation of Nature:

Order: Rodentia (rodents) 

Rodents make up the largest order of mammals, with over 40% of mammalian species. They have two incisors in the upper and lower jaw which grow continually and must be kept short by gnawing.

Suborder: Sciurognathi
Family: Sciuridae (squirrels)
Subfamily: Sciurinae
Tribe: Sciurini
Genus: Sciurus
 Caucasian squirrel, S. anomalus 
 Red squirrel, S. vulgaris 
Subfamily: Xerinae
Tribe: Marmotini
Genus: Spermophilus
 European ground squirrel, Spermophilus citellus VU
Family: Gliridae (dormice)
Subfamily: Leithiinae
Genus: Dryomys
 Forest dormouse, Dryomys nitedula LC
Genus: Muscardinus
 Hazel dormouse, Muscardinus avellanarius LC
Genus: Myomimus
 Roach's mouse-tailed dormouse, Myomimus roachi VU
Subfamily: Glirinae
Genus: Glis
 European edible dormouse, Glis glis LC
Family: Spalacidae
Subfamily: Spalacinae
Genus: Nannospalax
 Lesser mole rat, Nannospalax leucodon VU
Family: Cricetidae
Subfamily: Cricetinae
Genus: Cricetulus
 Grey dwarf hamster, Cricetulus migratorius LC
Subfamily: Arvicolinae
Genus: Arvicola
 European water vole, A. amphibius 
Genus: Chionomys
 Snow vole, Chionomys nivalis LC
Genus: Clethrionomys
 Bank vole, Clethrionomys glareolus LC
Genus: Microtus
 Felten's vole, Microtus felteni LC
 Günther's vole, Microtus guentheri LC
 Southern vole, Microtus rossiaemeridionalis LC
 European pine vole, Microtus subterraneus LC
 Thomas's pine vole, Microtus thomasi LC
Family: Muridae (mice, rats, voles, gerbils, hamsters, etc.)
Subfamily: Deomyinae
Genus: Acomys
 Crete spiny mouse, Acomys minous VU
Subfamily: Murinae
Genus: Mus
 House mouse, M. musculus 
Genus: Apodemus
 Striped field mouse, Apodemus agrarius LC
 Yellow-necked mouse, Apodemus flavicollis LC
 Broad-toothed field mouse, Apodemus mystacinus LC
 Wood mouse, Apodemus sylvaticus LC

Order: Lagomorpha (lagomorphs) 

The lagomorphs comprise two families, Leporidae (hares and rabbits), and Ochotonidae (pikas). Though they can resemble rodents, and were classified as a superfamily in that order until the early 20th century, they have since been considered a separate order. They differ from rodents in a number of physical characteristics, such as having four incisors in the upper jaw rather than two.

Family: Leporidae
Genus: Lepus
European hare, L. europaeus 
Genus: Oryctolagus
European rabbit, O. cuniculus  introduced

Order: Erinaceomorpha (hedgehogs and gymnures) 

The order Erinaceomorpha contains a single family, Erinaceidae, which comprise the hedgehogs and gymnures. The hedgehogs are easily recognised by their spines while gymnures look more like large rats.

Family: Erinaceidae (hedgehogs)
Subfamily: Erinaceinae
Genus: Erinaceus
 Northern white-breasted hedgehog, E. roumanicus

Order: Soricomorpha (shrews, moles, and solenodons) 

The "shrew-forms" are insectivorous mammals. The shrews and solenodons closely resemble mice while the moles are stout-bodied burrowers.
Family: Soricidae (shrews)
Subfamily: Crocidurinae
Genus: Crocidura
 Bicolored shrew, Crocidura leucodon
 Greater white-toothed shrew, Crocidura russula LC
Lesser white-toothed shrew, C. suaveolens 
 Cretan shrew, Crocidura zimmermanni VU
Genus: Suncus
 Etruscan shrew, Suncus etruscus LC
Subfamily: Soricinae
Tribe: Nectogalini
Genus: Neomys
 Southern water shrew, Neomys anomalus
 Eurasian water shrew, Neomys fodiens
Tribe: Soricini
Genus: Sorex
 Common shrew, Sorex araneus
 Eurasian pygmy shrew, Sorex minutus
Family: Talpidae (moles)
Subfamily: Talpinae
Tribe: Talpini
Genus: Talpa
 Mediterranean mole, Talpa caeca
 European mole, Talpa europaea
 Stankovic's mole, Talpa stankovici

Order: Chiroptera (bats) 

The bats' most distinguishing feature is that their forelimbs are developed as wings, making them the only mammals capable of flight. Bat species account for about 20% of all mammals.

Family: Pteropodidae (flying foxes, Old World fruit bats)
Subfamily: Pteropodinae
Genus: Rousettus
 Egyptian fruit bat, R. aegyptiacus 
Family: Vespertilionidae
Subfamily: Myotinae
Genus: Myotis
Lesser mouse-eared bat, M. blythii 
Brandt's bat, M. brandti 
Long-fingered bat, M. capaccinii 
Geoffroy's bat, M. emarginatus 
Greater mouse-eared bat, M. myotis 
Whiskered bat, M. mystacinus 
Natterer's bat, M. nattereri 
Subfamily: Vespertilioninae
Genus: Eptesicus
 Serotine bat, E. serotinus 
Genus: Hypsugo
Savi's pipistrelle, H. savii 
Genus: Nyctalus
Greater noctule bat, N. lasiopterus 
Lesser noctule, N. leisleri 
Common noctule, N. noctula 
Genus: Pipistrellus
Nathusius' pipistrelle, P. nathusii 
 Common pipistrelle, P. pipistrellus 
Genus: Plecotus
 Grey long-eared bat, P. austriacus 
Genus: Vespertilio
 Parti-coloured bat, V. murinus 
Subfamily: Miniopterinae
Genus: Miniopterus
Common bent-wing bat, M. schreibersii 
Family: Molossidae
Genus: Tadarida
 European free-tailed bat, T. teniotis 
Family: Nycteridae
Genus: Nycteris
Egyptian slit-faced bat, N. thebaica 
Family: Rhinolophidae
Subfamily: Rhinolophinae
Genus: Rhinolophus
Blasius's horseshoe bat, R. blasii 
Mediterranean horseshoe bat, R. euryale 
Greater horseshoe bat, R. ferrumequinum 
Lesser horseshoe bat, R. hipposideros 
Mehely's horseshoe bat, R. mehelyi

Order: Cetacea (whales) 

The order Cetacea includes whales, dolphins and porpoises. They are the mammals most fully adapted to aquatic life with a spindle-shaped nearly hairless body, protected by a thick layer of blubber, and forelimbs and tail modified to provide propulsion underwater. Dolphins are national animal of Greece although cetacean biodiversity in the Mediterranean is not as diverse as in nations facing outer oceans, and the Aegean Sea Greece's coasts are one of the furthermost basin of the inland sea and even less species regularly inhabit comparing to western basin.
Suborder: Mysticeti
Subfamily: Megapterinae
Genus: Megaptera
 Humpback whale, Megaptera novaeangliae VU
Family: Balaenopteridae (rorquals)
Genus: Balaenoptera
 Common minke whale, B. acutorostrata 
 Fin whale, Balaenoptera physalus EN
Suborder: Odontoceti
Family: Physeteridae (sperm whales)
Genus: Physeter
 Sperm whale, Physeter macrocephalus VU
Family: Ziphiidae (beaked whales)
Genus: Ziphius
 Cuvier's beaked whale, Ziphius cavirostris
Genus: Mesoplodon
 Sowerby's beaked whale, Mesoplodon bidens VU
Superfamily: Platanistoidea
Family: Phocoenidae (porpoises)
Genus: Phocoena
 Harbour porpoise, Phocoena phocoena VU
Family: Delphinidae (marine dolphins)
Genus: Tursiops
 Common bottlenose dolphin, Tursiops truncatus
Genus: Steno
 Rough-toothed dolphin, Steno bredanensis DD
Genus: Stenella
 Striped dolphin, Stenella coeruleoalba
Genus: Delphinus
 Short-beaked common dolphin, Delphinus delphis
Genus: Grampus
 Risso's dolphin, Grampus griseus DD
Genus: Pseudorca
 False killer whale, Pseudorca crassidens
Genus: Orcinus
 Orca, O. orca DD
Family: Monodontidae
Genus: Delphinapterus
 Beluga whale, Delphinapterus leucas VU (introduced)

Order: Carnivora (carnivorans) 

There are over 260 carnivore species, the majority of which feed primarily on meat. They have a characteristic skull shape and dentition.
Suborder: Feliformia
Family: Felidae
Subfamily: Felinae
Genus: Felis
 European wildcat, F. silvestris 
Genus: Lynx
 Eurasian lynx, L. lynx 
Suborder: Caniformia
Family: Canidae
Genus: Canis
 Golden jackal, C. aureus 
 European jackal, C. a. moreoticus
 Gray wolf, C. lupus 
 Eurasian wolf, C. l. lupus
Genus: Vulpes
 Red fox, V. vulpes 
Family: Ursidae
Genus: Ursus
 Brown bear, U. arctos 
 Eurasian brown bear, U. a. arctos
Family: Mustelidae
Genus: Lutra
European otter, L. lutra 
Genus: Martes
Beech marten, M. foina 
European pine marten, M. martes 
Genus: Meles
Caucasian badger, M. canescens 
Eurasian badger, M. meles 
Genus: Mustela
 Least weasel, M. nivalis 
 European polecat, M. putorius 
Genus: Neogale
American mink, N. vison  introduced
Genus: Vormela
Marbled polecat, V. peregusna 
Family: Phocidae
Genus: Monachus
Mediterranean monk seal, M. monachus

Order: Artiodactyla (even-toed ungulates) 

The even-toed ungulates are ungulates whose weight is borne about equally by the third and fourth toes, rather than mostly or entirely by the third as in perissodactyls. There are about 220 artiodactyl species, including many that are of great economic importance to humans.
Family: Cervidae (deer)
Subfamily: Cervinae
Genus: Cervus
Red deer, C. elaphus 
Genus: Dama
European fallow deer, D. dama 
Subfamily: Capreolinae
Genus: Capreolus
 Roe deer, C. capreolus 
Family: Bovidae (cattle, antelope, sheep, goats)
Subfamily: Caprinae
Genus: Rupicapra
Chamois, R. rupicapra 
Family: Suidae (pigs)
Subfamily: Suinae
Genus: Sus
Wild boar, S. scrofa

See also
List of chordate orders
Lists of mammals by region
List of prehistoric mammals
Mammal classification
List of mammals described in the 2000s

References

mammals
Greece
Greece